Mirosław Modzelewski (born 8 April 1970 in Poland) is a Polish retired footballer.

References

Polish footballers
Living people
Association football defenders
1970 births
Legia Warsaw players